This is a list of Swedish football transfers in the summer transfer window 2010 by club. 

Only transfers in and out between 1 July-31 July 2010 of the Allsvenskan and Superettan are included.

Allsvenskan

AIK

In:

Out:

BK Häcken

In:

Out:

Djurgårdens IF

In:

Out:

GAIS

In:

Out:

Gefle IF

In:

Out:

Halmstads BK

In:

Out:

Helsingborgs IF

In:

Out:

IF Brommapojkarna

In:

Out:

IF Elfsborg

In:

Out:

IFK Göteborg

In:

Out:

Kalmar FF

In:

Out:

Malmö FF

In:

Out:

Trelleborgs FF

In:

Out:

Åtvidabergs FF

In:

Out:

Örebro SK

In:

Out:

Superettan

Degerfors IF

In:

Out:

Falkenbergs FF

In:

Out:

FC Väsby United

In:

Out:

GIF Sundsvall

In:

Out:

Hammarby IF

In:

Out:

IFK Norrköping

In:

Out:

Jönköpings Södra IF

In:

Out:

Landskrona BoIS

In:

Out:

Ljungskile SK

In:

Out:

Syrianska FC

In:

Out:

Ängelholms FF

In:

Out:

Örgryte IS

In:

Out:

Östers IF

In:

Out:

See also
 Allsvenskan
 Superettan

Notes

References

Allsvenskan references

Superettan references

External links
 Official site of the SvFF 

Trans
Sweden
2010